Meike Peters is a James Beard Award-winning German cookbook author, blogger, podcaster, food and travel writer and photographer. She is the author of Eat In My Kitchen, published by Prestel Publishing (Penguin Random House) in October 2016 in English and in German and winner of the 2017 James Beard Foundation Book Award for General Cooking, and 365: A Year of Everyday Cooking and Baking, published in October 2019, a collection of 365 of her recipes for every day of the year. Both of her books were included in The New York Times Best Cookbook lists for Fall 2019 and Fall 2016. Her third book is called Noon and will be published in 2023 by Chronicle Books (English) and Prestel (German). In 2021, she started her Meet in My Kitchen podcast, inviting her guests to her Berlin kitchen (English and German episodes).

She studied architecture but in November 2013, she decided to start her food blog, Eat in My Kitchen, sharing a recipe each day in the first year of her blog. Her recipes combine German and Mediterranean cooking, and Christopher Kimball, Milk Street wrote "if you want to change how you cook—to learn new tricks—I heartily recommend 365. You may find some of her combinations challenging, but your everyday cooking will never be the same." Meike Peters lives in Berlin and spent many years in Malta. Her book 365 is dedicated to the Maltese investigative journalist Daphne Caruana Galizia.

Awards and recognition 

 James Beard Award "General Cooking" for Eat in My Kitchen (2017)
 Gourmand Award for 365: A Year of Everyday Cooking and Baking (2020)

Published works 

 Eat in My Kitchen (2016) 
 365: A Year of Everyday Cooking and Baking (2019)

References

External links 
 

Living people
James Beard Foundation Award winners
Women chefs
Cookbook writers
Writers from Berlin
Women cookbook writers
21st-century German women writers
21st-century German non-fiction writers
German women non-fiction writers
Year of birth missing (living people)